This is a list of libraries in Thailand:

National libraries
 National Library of Thailand (หอสมุดแห่งชาติ)

Library networks and associations
 Journal Link
 Provincial University Library Network - Pulinet
 Special Libraries Group - Thai Library Association
 Thai Library Association
 Thai Library Integrated System - ThaiLIS

Academic libraries

Public and autonomous university libraries
 Burapha University Library
 Chiang Mai University Library
 Chulalongkorn University Library
 Kasetsart University Library
 Khon Kaen University Library
 King Mongkut's Institute of Technology Ladkrabang Library
 King Mongkut's Institute of Technology North Bangkok Library
 King Mongkut's University of Technology Library
 Mae Fah Luang University Library
 Maejo University Library
 Mahasarakham University Library
 Mahidol University Library
 Naresuan University Library
 National Institute of Development Administration Library
 Prince of Songkla University Library
 Rajamangala University of Technology, Thanyaburi
 Ramkhamhaeng University Library
 Silpakorn University Library
 Srinakharinwirot University Library
 Sukhothai Thammathirat Open University Library
 Suranaree University of Technology Library
 Thammasat University Library
 Ubon Ratchathani University Library
 Walailak University Library

Private university libraries
 Asian Institute of Technology Library
 Assumption University Library
 Bangkok University Library
 Dhurakij Pundit University Library
 Huachiew Chalermprakiet University Library
 Kasem Bundit University Library
 Mahanakorn University of Technology Library
 Payap University Library
 Rangsit University Library
 Saint John's University Library
 Shinawatra University Library
 Siam University Library
 South East Asia University Library
 Sripatum University Library
 University of the Thai Chamber of Commerce Library
Martin de Tours Assumption College Library

Medical libraries
 Siriraj Medical Library

Public libraries
 Rajamangalapisek Library
 Bangkok City Library - The 4,789 m2 city library was opened in April 2017. Its facilities extend to four floors.

Research institute libraries
 Armed Forces Research Institute of Medical Science (AFRIMS) Library
 Chulabhorn Research Institute Library
 Health Systems Research Institute Library
 Research Library of National Research Council of Thailand
 Science and Technology Knowledge Services - STKS
 Thailand Institute of Scientific and Technological Research (TISTR) Knowledge Centre

Special libraries
 Maruey Knowledge & Resource Center: Library at Thailand's stock exchange next to the Queen Sirikit Center. Business and investment books.
 Neilson Hays Library
 Royal Thai Air Force Library
 Santi Pracha Dhamma Library
 Stang Mongkolsuk Library
 Suriyanuwat Library
 Thailand Creative & Design Center
 Thailand Knowledge Park - TKPark

See also

 List of libraries
 List of national libraries
 List of schools in Thailand
 List of universities in Thailand

References

External links

 National Library of Thailand
 Thai Library Association
 ห้องสมุด
 Library Success Wiki

 
Thailand
Libraries
Libraries